Koneru Humpy (born 31 March 1987) is an Indian chess player best known for winning the FIDE Women's rapid chess championship in 2019. In 2002, she became the youngest woman ever to achieve the title of Grandmaster (GM) at the age of 15 years, 1 month, 27 days, beating Judit Polgár's previous record by three months (this record was subsequently broken by Hou Yifan in 2008). In October 2007, Humpy became the second female player, after Polgár, to exceed the 2600 Elo rating mark, being rated 2606.

Career
Humpy won three gold medals at the World Youth Chess Championship: in 1997 (under-10 girls' division), 1998 (under-12 girls) and 2000 (under-14 girls). In 1999, at the Asian Youth Chess Championship, held in Ahmedabad, she won the under-12 section, competing with the boys. In 2001 Humpy won the World Junior Girls Championship. In the following year's edition, she tied for first place with Zhao Xue, but placed second on tiebreak. She became the eighth ever female Grandmaster in 2002. Humpy competed with the boys in the 2004 World Junior Championship, which was won by Pentala Harikrishna and tied for fifth place, finishing tenth on countback with a score of 8.5/13 points.

Humpy won the British Women's Championship in 2000 and in 2002. In 2003, she won the 10th Asian Women's Individual Championship and the Indian Women's Championship. In 2005, she won the North Urals Cup, a round-robin tournament held in Krasnoturyinsk, Russia featuring ten of the strongest female players in the world at the time.

She participated in the Women's World Chess Championship for the first time in 2004 and since then, she has competed in every edition of the event held with the knockout format. Humpy reached the semifinals in 2004, 2008 and 2010.

In 2009, she tied for 1st–4th with Alexander Areshchenko, Magesh Panchanathan and Evgenij Miroshnichenko in the Mumbai Mayor Cup.

In 2009, Humpy accused the All India Chess Federation of preventing her from participating in the 37th Chess Olympiad in Turin. Her father Humpy Ashok, who was coaching her, was not allowed to travel with her for tournaments.

Humpy took part in the FIDE Women's Grand Prix 2009–2011 and finished in overall second position, in turn qualifying as challenger for Women's World Chess Championship 2011. Hou Yifan won the match, winning three games and drawing five. Humpy finished runner-up in the FIDE Women's Grand Prix series also in the 2011–12, 2013–14, 2015–16 and 2019–21 editions.

She won the individual bronze at the Women's World Team Chess Championship 2015 held in Chengdu, China. Team India finished fourth in the competition – a point behind China, which won the bronze medal.

In 2019, she became women's World Rapid champion after coming back from a two-year maternity sabbatical.

In 2020, Humpy won the BBC Indian Sportswoman of the year award, following a public vote.

Humpy is representing India at 2022 Chess Olympiad which is being held in Mahabalipuram, Tamilnadu.

Personal life
She was originally named "Hampi" by her parents (Koneru Ashok and Latha Ashok) who derived the name from the word "champion".  Her father later changed the spelling to Humpy, to more closely resemble a Russian-sounding name.

In August 2014 she married Dasari Anvesh. Currently she is working with ONGC Ltd.

She gave birth to a baby daughter who is named Ahana in 2017.

FIDE Women's Grand Prix Titles

Achievements

 1999: Asia's youngest Woman International Master (WIM)
 2001: India's youngest Woman Grandmaster (WGM)
 2012 : Bronze at Women's World Rapid Chess Championship
 2019: Skolkovo Women's Grand Prix 2019–20
 2019: Monaco Women's Grand Prix 2019–20
 2019: Women's World Rapid Chess Championship
 2020: Gold at Cairns Cup
 2020: Silver at Speed Chess Championship
 2020: Gold at FIDE Online Chess Olympiad 2020
 2021: Bronze at FIDE Online Chess Olympiad 2021
 2022: Bronze at 44th Chess Olympiad
 2022: Gaprindashvili Cup Team Winner at 44th Chess Olympiad
 2022: Silver at Women's World Blitz Chess Championship 2022

Awards

 2003: Arjuna Award
 2007: Padma Shri
 2021: BBC Indian Sportswoman of the Year
 2021: Sportstar Aces Sportswoman of the Decade (Individual non-Olympic Sports)
 2022: Player of the Chess Tournament at PSPB Inter-unit Chess and Bridge Tournament (Mumbai)

See also 
 List of chess grandmasters

References

External links

 (1997–2000)
Interview with GM Humpy Humpy by LastChess.com

1987 births
Living people
Indian female chess players
Chess grandmasters
Female chess grandmasters
World Youth Chess Champions
World Junior Chess Champions
Chess Olympiad competitors
Asian Games medalists in chess
Asian Games gold medalists for India
Chess players at the 2006 Asian Games
Medalists at the 2006 Asian Games
People from Krishna district
Recipients of the Padma Shri in sports
Recipients of the Arjuna Award
Sportspeople from Vijayawada
Sportswomen from Andhra Pradesh
Sportswomen from Vijayawada, India
21st-century Indian women
20th-century Indian women
People from Andhra Pradesh
People from Vijayawada
Women from Andhra Pradesh
Sportspeople from Andhra Pradesh